Brig.-Gen. Reginald Francis Arthur Hobbs  (30 January 1878 – 10 July 1953) was a British Army officer who was Brigadier in charge of Administration, Western Command.

Early life and education
Hobbs was born in Tyldesley, Lancashire, to Capt. Simpson Hackett Hobbs of the 89th Foot, a wire manufacturer, and Sarah Bayley. His elder brother, Lt. Colonel Charles James Willoughby Hobbs, died of wounds in the First World War. He was educated at Wellington College and the Royal Military Academy, Woolwich.

Career

Hobbs was gazetted to the Royal Engineers in 1898. He served in the Boer War (1899–1902), the Somaliland campaign in 1903 and in  the Gold Coast in 1904–05. From 1907–11, he was technical supervisor at the School of Musketry. He returned to the field in the First World War, serving as assistant adjutant and quartermaster general in France and Italy until February 1918.

Following the war, he served as Brigadier in charge of Administration, Western Command, until his retirement in 1931.

He was appointed a Companion of the Distinguished Service Order (DSO) in 1901, a Companion of the Order of St Michael and St George (CMG) in the 1915 Birthday Honours and a Companion of the Order of the Bath (CB) in the 1931 New Year Honours.

Personal life
Hobbs married Frances Graham Stirling, daughter of Sir William Stirling. They had three sons, two of whom were killed in action in North Africa: Maj.-Gen. Reginald Hobbs (1908–1977), Major Peter Graham Hobbs (1911–1942) of the Royal Artillery, killed in action in Libya, and Lt Col William Paul Hobbs (1914–1943), killed in action in Tunisia.

He died at his home in Sutton Veny, near Warminster, Wiltshire, aged 75.

References

External links

1878 births
1953 deaths
People from Tyldesley
People educated at Wellington College, Berkshire
Graduates of the Royal Military Academy, Woolwich
Royal Engineers officers
Companions of the Order of the Bath
Companions of the Order of St Michael and St George
Companions of the Distinguished Service Order
British Army personnel of the Second Boer War
British Army personnel of World War I
British Army brigadiers
Military personnel from Lancashire